Norman Leslie Spencer (born 13 August 1914) is a British film producer, production manager and screenwriter, especially notable for his collaborations with director David Lean during the 1940s and '50s.

Early life

He was born in Stockwell, London, and grew up in Essex.

Career

Spencer began in the film industry in the mid-1930s, initially doing extra work. He first met David Lean when he was a gofer at Denham Studios and Lean was an editor. His first job on a Lean film was as assistant director on Lean's debut as a director, In Which We Serve (1942).

Spencer became Lean's production manager after joining Cineguild Productions in 1944 and went on to work on Lean's acclaimed adaptation of the Charles Dickens novel, Great Expectations (1946), and later co-scrpited and co-produced Lean's film of Harold Brighouse's play Hobson's Choice (1954). Lean's first casting suggestion for the lead role was Welsh-born Roger Livesey, but Spencer convinced him to cast Charles Laughton instead, later explaining: "Laughton was a Yorkshireman and he would be playing a Lancastrian, so you'd get regional accuracy, more or less, with international casting. And I thought it needed that size of character." Spencer's last producing credit for Lean was Summertime (1955), which, according to Spencer, Lean was asked to direct by producer Alexander Korda. Spencer later collaborated with Lean on a re-write of the script for The Bridge on the River Kwai (1957) leading up to the film's production, after Lean was unhappy with the one Carl Foreman had written. Foreman was later asked to re-write the script by the film's producer Sam Spiegel. Spencer would  work again for Lean on the Moroccan shoot for Lawrence of Arabia (1962), although his work was uncredited.

His later producing credits include the American action film Vanishing Point (1971) and Richard Attenborough's film Cry Freedom (1987).

Personal life
As of 2009 Spencer was living in Denham, Buckinghamshire.

In July 2013, Spencer attended a special screening of Great Expectations at Wolterton Hall, Norfolk.

References

External links
 
 Norman Spencer interview at British Entertainment History Project.

1914 births
Living people
British film producers
English centenarians
English film producers
English screenwriters
Men centenarians